Lachnocnema vuattouxi, the western woolly legs, is a butterfly in the family Lycaenidae. It is found in Senegal, Guinea, Liberia, Ivory Coast, Burkina Faso, Ghana, Togo, Benin, Nigeria, from Cameroon to Uganda, Kenya and northern Tanzania. The habitat consists of open areas in Guinea savanna and open areas in the vicinity of forests, including degraded agricultural lands.

References

Butterflies described in 1915
Miletinae